Glenn Turner (born 1947) is a New Zealand cricketer.

Glenn Turner may also refer to:

 Glenn Turner (field hockey) (born 1984), Australian field hockey player
 Glenn Turner (bobsleigh) (born 1964), Australian Olympic bobsledder
 Glenn P. Turner (1889–1975), Wisconsin politician
 Maurice Glenn Turner (died 1995), victim of murderer Lynn Turner